Colentina A.C. București was a football club based in Bucharest, in southern Romania. It was founded in 1909 and it soon became one of the best teams in the country, winning two Romanian Championships The club was dissolved in 1947.

History

The second club from Bucharest, founded in April 1909, represented the workers and clerks of the Colentina Cotton Factory, English society. The first president of the club was Mastejan, the factory president. The most famous players were: Matthews, Catteral, Middleton, Thompson, Deburst.

The club succeeds to win two consecutive editions of the Romanian Championship, before the First World War, in 1912–13 and 1913–14. Just before the outbreak of the war, the players, most of them English, leave the country and the team enters into a slow process of dissolution.

In 1915, a part of the members of Olympia București (then in a dissolution process) come to Colentina and the team manages to resist one more year.

After the War, the club activates in the Bucharest District Championship, and during the period before World War Two, the team appears a single time at a divisionary level, in 1946–1947 in Liga III. After this, there are no more records about the club's activity, in the end being dissolved.

Honours

Liga I:
Winners (2): 1912–13, 1913–14
Runners-up (2): 1909–10, 1914–15

References

Association football clubs established in 1909
Association football clubs disestablished in 1947
Defunct football clubs in Romania
Football clubs in Bucharest
History of Bucharest
1910 establishments in Romania
1947 disestablishments in Romania
Works association football clubs in Romania